The Suakin Archipelago is a large group of islets found in Sudan in the Red Sea, which has been proposed for IUCN category II, national park.

References

National parks of Sudan